

The Wren Goldcrest was a British single-seat ultra-light low-wing monoplane designed by R.G. Carr and built by the Wren Aircraft Company at Kirklington near Carlisle in 1946.

Development
The Goldcrest was powered by a single  Scott Squirrel inverted air-cooled two-cylinder in-line piston aero-engine. One aircraft only which was registered G-AICX in August 1946. The production aircraft was planned to use a  horizontal-opposed four-cylinder two-stroke engine designed by Wren. The aircraft was scrapped in 1947 when plans to put the type into production were cancelled due to a problem obtaining approved materials.

Specifications

References

Notes

Bibliography

1940s British civil utility aircraft
Low-wing aircraft
Single-engined tractor aircraft